The Replacements is an American animated television series that aired on Disney Channel from July 28, 2006, to March 30, 2009. 52 episodes were produced.

Premise
The opening sequence explains that two siblings, Todd and Riley, lived in what used to be an orphanage with their birth parents' fate unrevealed. While cleaning the floors, they stumbled across a Fleemco comic book containing an ad for the Fleemco phone. They mail-ordered the ad and $1.98 for the phone—which allows them to replace any person or animal they desire—and in the process they got new parents: a British secret agent named Agent K and a professional daredevil named Dick Daring. Whenever Todd and Riley want to replace someone undesirable, they call Conrad Fleem on the Fleemco phone via a large button. Fleemco immediately replaces the person with someone whom the siblings prefer. The series follows their misadventures as they attempt to better their lives by replacing unwanted people, with said attempt usually backfiring and both learning a lesson about appreciating what they already have.

Episodes

Characters

Main

 Todd Bartholomew Daring (voiced by Nancy Cartwright) is Riley's 11-year-old younger brother. Todd is the lazy, troublemaking, and selfish one of the siblings. He and Riley are the adopted children of K and Dick Daring. Todd usually uses the Fleemco phone to replace people for selfish purposes. He is best friends with Jacobo and Shelton. One episode revealed he has a talent for singing. Todd loves the Monkey Cop movie series and playing the GameCone (a parody of Nintendo GameCube) video game console. He hates school, learning, and reading, which forces him to replace the librarian in another episode. His catchphrases are "Don't judge me" and "Sweet." In "Ratted Out" for the first time, Todd sings the second verse to "My Rat Buddy" at the end of the episode. In season 2, Todd still has feelings for Sierra after the one-time bond between the two in a parody of the Star Trek fan club. In the episode "Tasumi Unmasked," Todd formed his single band and battles against the mailman for his "Game Cone 4".
 Riley Eugene Daring (voiced by Grey DeLisle) is Todd's 13-year-old older sister. She is the kinder, more caring, and reliable sibling who enjoys school. She generally uses the Fleemco phone to replace mean or unfair adults who do not take her seriously. She is a girly girl who enjoys equestrianism, Hornet Hive Scouts (a Girl Scout-type of youth group), and pretty much any form of sugar. She has an imaginary unicorn friend named Rainbow Jumper and gets a B average in school. At one point, she was part of the journalism staff at school. She has a crush on Johnny Hitswell, and they became a couple in season 2, but Johnny breaks up with her because of her controlling attitude in "Heartbreak in the City." Riley claims she is over him, despite many people who claim otherwise. Riley, contrary to her caring and thoughtful demeanor, is often prone to jealousy. In "She Works Hard For The Movie," it's revealed Riley has an Aunt named Debbie, and her middle name is Eugene. 
 Karen Mildred "Agent K" Daring (voiced by Kath Soucie) resembles Emma Peel. She is the siblings' adoptive British mother and is a 6'1''-tall superspy. From an outside view, it may seem she doesn't care for her kids or husband, but in fact, she loves them devotedly, even though she may express it through a recording or videotape. If something seems unfair, she fixes it very quickly. She is also bad at cooking. Her career as a spy has caused her paranoia. In the episode Abra K Dabra!, it is revealed that she has stage fright and that her middle name is Mildred. She also habitually thinks all her chores are secret missions. She plays classical violin, which Riley hates, and it puts Dick to sleep. K once took karate lessons from the evil Master Pho (Master Foe) to bust his secret evil bank-robbing karate gang. Even though she's just as logical as C.A.R. (albeit less sarcastic and violent), she seems to favor Dick over him. Even though both Dick and Agent K have contrasting personalities, they still seem to be very much in love and care for Riley and Todd as their children. Her mother is also a secret agent.
 Richard Marion "Dick" Daring (voiced by Daran Norris) is the siblings' adoptive father and the world-greatest daredevil. He is a semi-former stunt artist and is constantly working on new tricks. His appearance resembles that of Evel Knievel. He is also very immature and owns a teddy bear known as "Evel Bearnievel." He thinks that C.A.R. is his best friend, though C.A.R. doesn't see it that way. Dick bought Riley a mule named Prince Cinnamon Boots instead of a horse like she wanted. Like Todd, Dick isn't smart at all. In "The Spy Who Wasn't Riley," we learn that Dick has coulrophobia and tries to force Todd to be a stunt man instead of a circus clown for his career. It is also revealed in one episode that he is a better cook than K. His catchphrase is "Look out below!"
 C.A.R.T.E.R. (also known as C.A.R.) (voiced by David McCallum) is the high-tech family car with a British accent (like Agent K). He can do just about anything but is not always preparing to do something for the family, especially not for Dick. He often calls Dick a twit but is often indifferent to him. He never lets Dick drive him (presumably under the assumption that Dick's daredevil habits would wreck him) and scare Dick using "The Oslo Option," which consists of C.A.R.T.E.R. pulling out a large spinning buzzsaw blade from his hood. The family usually refers to him as simply C.A.R., which is most likely a parody of K.I.T.T from Knight Rider. C.A.R also resembles the Mach Five from Speed Racer. In the episode Tasumi Unmasked, C.A.R used to be a one-man-band player but was kicked out for not being perfect. They destroyed his instruments. Also, in this episode, he had a goatee, possibly real or not. He is sarcastic, humorous, and violent.
 Conrad Fleem (voiced by Jeff Bennett) is the mysterious owner of the Fleemco company. He processes Todd and Riley's requests whenever they call him. He has a very long mustache. His face is never shown until the episode "Irreplaceable," where he reveals himself as Todd & Riley's red-headed uncle.

Supporting
 Tasumi (voiced by Lauren Tom) is Riley's best friend, who is of Japanese descent and has a crush on Jacobo, as revealed in one episode when she kissed him. Tasumi's crush on Jacobo is also hinted at in "The Truth Hurts" when she passes on a note in the classroom that asks Jacobo if she liked him and was crushed when he signed maybe. She wears a pink metal suit which resembles RoboCop, but she no longer wears it during season 2. She claims her family is part of a crime-fighting team. (parody of Power Rangers/Super Sentai). She also has a list of people she hates. Riley is either on or off it. In the episode "Best friends For-Never?" it appears Riley first meets Tasumi in a broom closet when she was new at school and tried to get to homeroom but got lost. Tasumi was in the broom closet because she split her armor and was embarrassed, but Riley fixed it with the duct tape her father made her carry. In the episode "Tasumi Unmasked", it is revealed that Tasumi is in fact a Japanese pop star. She moved to Pleasant Hills in order to escape the constant adoration of her fans and live a peaceful life, as Pleasant Hills was voted as the least culturally aware town in the world and she believed that no one would recognize her. However, in order to make sure that no one recognized her, she wore a costume from a popular anime and used details from that anime in order to get a new history. That is the reason she always referred to things such as fighting giant monsters and so forth, but in reality, she never did anything of that sort. When her fans found out about this, she moved back to Japan for two weeks to record a new album until Riley replaced her band members with orangutans and she got kicked out by her new orangutan members because she has thumbs (even though orangutans do have thumbs). She came back to Pleasant Hills with Riley and no longer wears her metal suit, dumping it in the garbage. Under her metal suit, Tasumi has long black hair and a pretty face complete with a beauty mark. She wears a blue wig with her metal suit. She also has a brother named Roku.
 Abbey Willson (voiced by Erica Hubbard in season 1, Tempestt Bledsoe in season 2) is Riley's other best friend, who is of African-American descent. Even though she hates the popular girls such as Sierra, she is seen wanting to be a part of them so bad, and habitually tells Sierra she is cool, even though she doesn't mean to. It also seems that her parents are rich. She sometimes can be hypocritical. She has a younger sister named Tiffany who dated Todd in the episode "A Little Tiff".
 Jacobo Jacobo (HA-CO-BO) (voiced by Candi Milo) is Todd's best friend who is of Mexican descent (though his shirt has the colors of the flag of Spain). He has a funny-looking mouth. Jacobo loves mystery books and has a secret talent for singing. He has a crush on Agent K and is always trying to win her affections, even in the episode "Irreplaceable," when he begins to date Tasumi.
 Shelton Gunnar Klutzberry (voiced by Jeff Bennett) is Todd's other best friend and the stereotypical nerd at school. He is afraid of girls, and once had a relationship with Celebrity Starr. He also has an imaginary girlfriend named Zelda (since an imaginary girlfriend is all that he can handle). He often thinks of himself as cool and calls the others nerds. He becomes very muscular and handsome when he takes his glasses off, but this is not to his advantage because he cannot use contacts, and has to have heavy glasses (which causes him to appear weak and scrawny). He always seems to be where ever Todd and Riley are. He sometimes just wants to be part of a popular group. In one episode he is seen to have a giant pet tortoise. In another he and his whole family are stated to be Jewish. His voice and mannerisms are mostly similar to the famous comedian Jerry Lewis's character from the movie "The Nutty Professor". When he speaks of characteristics or actions, he clarifies them by saying "with the" and adding a list of adjectives and effects (etc. "Victory is mine... with the winning, and the accomplishing, and the rubbing it in your face!"). When he gets hurt, he usually says "Hoigle!"
 Buzz Winters (voiced by Grey DeLisle) is a wannabe bully and is Todd's nemesis. He usually makes silly jokes then laughs at them saying "Good one Buzz!" and "I got to start writing these down!" Although he is normally a bully in some episodes they have put their differences aside and even become friends. Deep down Buzz is jealous of Todd and Riley because their father is cooler than his is, as Buzz's father used to be the coolest in the neighborhood until Todd and Riley came along. On more than one account Buzz has been mistaken for a wild boar, although, both times, this was by Dingo McGee, on "Field Trippin'" and "Volcano Island". He also has a taste for crabgrass. Like Todd, Buzz hates school, and habitually cheats. He has many secrets including his love of the theater, and what he calls his only two shames, small feet, and ice skating.
 Donny Rottweiler (voiced by Jess Harnell) is a professional bully who is much taller than Todd, but still attends his school. He is Buzz's mentor and Todd's other nemesis, feared because of his giant size.
 Johnny Hitswell (voiced by Dee Bradley Baker) is the subject of Riley's affection and her middle school sweet heart. Even though every girl in the school is all over him, he tends to always ignore them, except for his annual Kumquat Day card readings. He enjoys basketball and baseball, and plays on the same baseball team as Todd and Riley. It is true that he likes Riley, because he asked her out on a date and then kissed her. But in season 2, he starts dating Riley as boyfriend and girlfriend. In the second season, Johnny breaks up with Riley for being to controlling after she followed him all the way to New York with Abby and Tasumi. He once stated in a later episode that she could be smothering as she was in a conversation with her friends. By the end of the series, he really admits that he wants to get back together with Riley, but he says this while talking to her robot duplicate, and it is never shown if he and Riley do get back together.
 Sierra McCool (voiced by Tara Strong) is the popular girl at school, and is Riley's nemesis. She is constantly competing with Riley for the affections of Johnny Hitswell. In the second season, when Riley and Johnny become a couple, her crush on him persists, and her aim becomes to break them up so she can be Johnny's girlfriend. She has her own posse (Jennifer and Claudia) and a huge, conceited ego. She is seen to have another side in which, she is infatuated with a Star Trek parody mentioned, which Todd also likes. This advances a bond between the two, which doesn't last long when she becomes a cheerleader again. It is mentioned in the series finale that she gets her own Fleemco Phone. She has long black hair in pigtails.
 Principal Cutler (voiced by Jeff Bennett) is the Inuit principal of George Stapler Middle School. Since he is originally from Alaska, he allows school on major snow days until Todd and Riley changed it one time. He is also very cheap and cares about money over the students, the school, and the faculty (he saves money for a vacation on Tahiti).
 Prince Cinnamon Boots (voiced by Daran Norris) is the Daring Family's pet mule. He was originally given to Riley by her father when she asked for a show horse. PCB has many talents but is often forgotten by his family after Dick says "I keep thinking we're forgetting something."
 Shelly Klutzberry (voiced by Candi Milo) is Shelton's older sister who has fewer appearances than her brother. She resembles her brother but does never change appearance when her glasses are taken off. In "Late Night With Todd and Riley" she is first mentioned as Shelton's sister and also we learn she loves Dustin Dreamlake. Though never mentioned, she presumably already had her bat mitzvah.
 Jennifer (voiced by Lauren Tom) and Claudia (voiced by Erica Hubbard or Tempestt Bledsoe) are two blonde-haired twin girls who are usually seen with Sierra McCool. In the episode, "The Insecurity Guard" from the first season, a common gag was for the two girls to be commenting on what they are wearing when Todd falls in a mud puddle next to them, ruining their clothes.

Recurring

 Phil Mygrave (voiced by Rob Paulsen) is Dick's stunt coordinator and brother and Riley and Todd's uncle. He is not very good with measurements, as he doesn't use proper units of measurements, rather just "tweaking the thingy on the whatchimacallit a smidge". He has also been married several times, and has poor advice for maintaining a relationship. He was twice replaced by Riley, first when Riley felt that his setting up of Dick's stunts were unprofessional and dangerous, and nearly ruins Dick's career by making all his stunts too safe, and second when Riley tried to get Dick a better love coach, and almost ended up costing Dick his stunt secrets. His name is a play on the phrase "fill my grave", referring to his shoddy assembly of Dick's stunts, a fact only noticed by C.A.R.T.E.R.
 Agent B (voiced by Carolyn Seymour) is Agent K's mother and Todd and Riley's grandmother. She is the headmistress of the Royal Academy of Spies. She seems to not get along with K before the episode "London Calling", but in the episode they reconcile and B becomes a loving grandmother to Riley and Todd.
 Agent G (voiced by Michael York) is Agent K's father and Todd and Riley's grandfather. He is the chief inventor of the Royal Academy of Spies, and gave cool presents to Todd and Riley in the episode "London Calling". He scared Dick when he saw the five clones of Agent G, claiming that no one would like 5 fathers-in-law.
 Gordo Glideright (voiced by Bruce Campbell) is Dick's stunt rival. He is always trying to steal Dick's stunt secrets. He once had Phil Mygrave as his stunt coordinator, and injured himself. He also tried to steal Dick's stunt secrets during his time as Dick's love coach.
 Dustin Dreamlake (voiced by Jason Marsden) is a parody of pop star Justin Timberlake. Riley's idol. He danced at Riley's 13th birthday party/Also on the holiday special.
 Ace Palmero (voiced by Dee Bradley Baker) – Local news reporter of Pleasant Hills, he always refers to himself as "I, Ace Palmero". A recurring gag involves only his profile being shown on TV with the camera changing whenever he turns to face it.
 Dr. Hans Herkmer (voiced by Jeff Bennett) is a scientist who works for the space program. He worked with Dick Daring in becoming a Space pilot in "Space Family Daring". He also was his replacement stunt coordinator in "Jumping Mad", and almost ruined his career as a stuntman by making all of Dick's stunts too safe, and replacing him with a monkey.
 Amanda McMurphy (voiced by Candi Milo) is a hard-hitting investigator reporter who helped Riley with the school newspaper. She also got the story on how Todd's rat was able to reverse the aging process. She eventually found out about Riley and Todd's Fleemco phones and asked them to replace her because she was tired of working for the George Stapler Middle School.
 Fabian Le'Tool (voiced by Rob Paulsen) is a professional male hairstylist who gives Riley a full makeover for a dance. He also prepares Todd's hair for a press conference about Todd's reversing the aging process. There is usually a running gag that reveals the fact he wears a wig (even by himself).
 Davey Hunkerhoff (voiced by Zac Efron) is a super hot lifeguard (and a younger spoofed version of David Hasselhoff) that Riley used to make Johnny Hitswell jealous in the episode "Davey Hunkerhoff" when he refused to notice her. However, he actually had feelings for Riley, which inevitably led to complications between the two.
 Skye Blossoms (voiced by Tara Strong) is a prevalent replacement. A hippie who refuses to judge people and believes the answers to all of your questions are "what you feel the answer is."
 Mr. Vanderbosh (voiced by Rob Paulsen) is Riley's stern teacher who sent Riley to double detention after she accidentally ripped his pants, and later gave her a quadruple detention. He also sent Riley and Tasumi to the guidance office in "Best friends For-Never". He's usually mean at times.
 The Kelpmans (voiced by Chip Chinery and Mary Elizabeth McGlynn) are next-door neighbors to the Darings. They were once replaced on Halloween by the Zupecks. It turned out that they worked on developing ice creams which made them too busy to prepare any Halloween decorations.
 Lady Lady (voiced by Grey DeLisle) is a professional wrestler who settled Tasumi and Riley's feud for Todd in "Best Friends For-Never?". She is married to the Canadian knucklehead in "Serf's Up" before being interrupted by a mean guest "Abraslam Lincoln" for unknown reasons. Also appeared as one of Dr. Scorpius' minions in "Irreplaceable".
 Wrestler Announcer (voiced by Jim Cummings) announces the wrestling matches since Riley and Tasumi's end-of-friendship argument in "Best friends For-Never". He announced Lady Lady's Marriage to Canadian Knucklehead in "Serf's Up."
 Celebrity Starr (voiced by Miley Cyrus in the first appearance, Jessica DiCicco in the second appearance) – This celebrity was first found replacing Shelton's imaginary girlfriend, Zelda because Shelton had defended Riley when Sierra put a love note in Riley's locker saying it was from Shelton. Riley felt poor and had Zelda replaced with Celebrity who liked nearsighted nerds. She became so annoying that Shelton broke up with her. Even with that she vowed to never let him go causing him to lose his glasses making him a "complete hottie", which wasn't her mood and she broke up with him. In contrary to all that there was gossip going around that Shelton broke up with her, which he did. She returned to get revenge on the young nerd by making a movie to dehumanize him. She ended up casting Todd in hopes to pursue him. In the end, Todd turned her plan around and protected his friend. She instead made a movie to make fun of Todd. Also appeared as one of Scorpius' minions in "Irreplaceable".
 Zephremiah and Silent Joe (both voiced by Dee Bradley Baker) are a pair of twins that are friends of Todd's. They were both in Todd's boy choir. Zephremiah apparently likes sports. His twin brother, Silent Joe, is apparently sensitive and rarely talks and communicates by grunting. Joe only talks in "Boyzroq!" when he and his brother are arguing about which one is the sensitive one.
 Splatter Train is a fictional character in a recurring horror movie throughout the show. One of these times is when Todd has a sleepover and shows a scary movie with this character in it, (I think I can, I think I can, splatter you!), and another is in Riley's flashback where she was on a date with Johnny Hitswell at the movies.
 Tiny Evil (voiced by Jason Marsden) – Enemy of Agent K. He is first mentioned in "Riley's Birthday" when Agent K convinced Dustin Dreamlake to sing at her party by telling him that she needed his help capturing "the cleverly disguised spy known as Tiny Evil". Is never actually seen until a much later episode, ("Canadian Fakin'"), where he pretended to be a boy from Canada in order to infiltrate Agent K's secret room of weapons and use them against her, on Dr. Scorpius' orders.
 Doctor Skorpius (voiced by Dave Wittenberg) – Archenemy of Agent K and the main antagonist of the series. "Doctor" is not his title, but his first name, as shown on the address label of his "Window Washer Weekly" magazine in "The Spy Who Wasn't Riley" (Mr. Doctor Skorpius, 1 Secret Mountaintop Way). He has a scorpion tail-shaped beard and is usually seen trying to take over the world in some way. He is also known for speaking with a lisp. In "The Spy Who Wasn't Riley,", he tried to destroy Antarctica with a giant laser cannon. In another episode, he was seen relaxing on a beach that Todd and Riley happened to be on at the time. In "The Rizzle", Todd finds out that he needs glasses, but Agent K thinks he has been infected with "Dr. Scorpius' Genetically Crafted Island Eye-Fog".
 Goober (voiced by Dee Bradley Baker and T-Bone (voiced by Jess Harnell) are radio DJs whom Todd idolizes. Throughout the show, they will make random appearances where they host radio contests, etc. Usually these contests will involve the Party Peacock in some way. They were replaced by Buzz Winters in the episode "Phone-less In Pleasant Hills" when he found Riley's Fleemco phone.
 Buck Spikes (voiced by John DiMaggio) is a tough baseball coach who replaced Todd and Riley's old coach, Pops. Buck keeps pushing kids to the limit, and when they strike out, he cruelly throws them into a cage. Buck does not appear until the series finale, "Irreplaceable," as one of Dr. Scorpius' minions.
 'Puter Dude 13 (voiced by Jeff Bennett) is a "cool and mysterious recluse" (he's really a nerd) who runs the online interactive game, Fleemster. He was only seen in one episode where he met Todd and Riley after Todd got too obsessed with Fleemster.
 Heather Hartley is the "Her Girl" for Teen Swoon Magazine. She has an outrageous hairstyle and usually carries around her pet turtle on a leash. According to Tasumi, "she was on the cover because she was famous, but she was famous for being on the cover". Anyway, she was replaced by Riley after she finally got sick of everyone at her school emulating her, only to become the new Her Girl herself.
 Petrov (voiced by Dee Bradley Baker) is another enemy of Agent K. Has appeared in a few episodes where he is usually opposed by Agent K and promptly apprehended by her.
 Dr. Clonemaster is yet another Agent K rival. He was seen only in the episode, "The Means Justify the Trend", in a flashback of Agent K. The cause of this flashback was Riley attempting to confide in her mother about everyone in her school dressing just like Heather Hartley, (see above). After Riley told her about this, she fears that the evil Dr. Clonemaster is up to his same tricks again, and promptly leaves to fight him.
 Dingo McGee (voiced by Jeff Bennett and Carlos Alazraqui) is the replacement sent by Fleemco when Todd got sick of an archaeologist treating them like babies on a field trip in the episode "Field Trippin'". He's an adventurous, usually reckless, explorer who plays the didgeridoo. He also returned in a later episode where he hosted the popular TV show, Volcano Island, in which the families of Buzz Winters, Shelton Klutzberry, and Todd and Riley Daring all competed. He descends from Australia.
 Robo Fleem SGX (voiced by Diedrich Bader) is a giant security robot that replaced the incompetent security guard at Todd's school in "The Insecurity Guard". However, the robot later went crazy and tried to destroy Riley when she tried to return it to Fleemco. This robot is the reason where George Washington Middle School became George Stapler Middle School, because it threatened to kill a teacher if she didn't say Todd was right the George Stapler was the first president of the United States. Its head also makes cameo appearances in the School in the episodes "Ratted Out" and "She Works Hard for the Movies". Another one was manufactured by Dr. Scorpius in "Irreplaceable" to destroy Todd's friends.
 Mrs. Shusher (voiced by Tara Strong) is the shush-happy librarian at George Stapler Middle School. Todd got sick of her forcing everyone to be quiet, and later replaced her with a librarian who was the complete opposite of her. She returned later in the episode when her replacement was returned by Todd and Riley.
 Gammazor, Mecha-Gammazor, and Grammazor – All rumored enemies of Tasumi. There are pictures of them on her "list" whenever she brings it out and threatens to put Riley on it. They both possibly descend Godzilla, Mecha-Godzilla, and as a running gag, Grammazor which only appeared in the episode "Tasumi Unmasked".
 Garth (voiced by Dee Bradley Baker) is the school janitor that is constantly being replaced by Todd and (more often) Riley when they need a quick replacement. Garth is not very enthusiastic about his job and is fully lazy. He is also not very intelligent but seems to know that whenever he inconveniences the Darings, he gets to go somewhere nice (usually). He is also the leader of the school Smite Club and was also one of Doctor Scorpius's minions in "Irreplaceable."
 Mrs. Fragile (voiced by Kath Soucie) is a replacement who is very fragile. She becomes very upset when Buzz pronounces her name "fragile" instead of "Frah-heel-leh." She also becomes upset when she thinks Riley and Tasumi are acting dumb to take advantage of the substitute teacher.

Locations
 Pleasant Hills is a typical U.S.town where the show is set.
 The Fun O' Sphere is a very cool and popular hangout for kids like Todd and Jacobo. It features an arcade and an international food court. Todd had his German teacher replaced in order to be allowed to go there in the episode "German Squirmin'". In another episode, Buzz bet Todd 100 Fun O' Sphere prize tickets if Todd's dad could beat his dad in the Pleasant Hills Septathalon. Todd then has a vision of him buying a giant T-Rex with his prize tickets.
 Volcano Island is a very popular reality show where the biggest celebrities, (including Heather Hartley, Ace Palmero, Dustin Dreamlake, and Celebrity Starr) all battle for survival. In a later episode, the Winters, Klutzberry, and Daring families all competed on Volcano Island in a special family edition of the show.
 Camp Notalottadoe is a camp with a pretty self-explanatory name that Todd and Riley go to in Season Two of the show. Riley is made a camp counselor and given power over Todd, Shelton, and Buzz, but exploits this power and goes out for a night with other camp counselors, an action that leads to the aforementioned kids getting lost in the woods.
 Obrich Gardens is the local zoo in Pleasant Hills which is looked down upon by Riley as it is full of animals shoved into extremely narrowed cages. She later replaces Hiram Smeck, a worker at this zoo (who was very underpaid), which only leads to more trouble as a result. She releases all the animals, and the remainder of the episode was spent getting them back. At the end of the episode, they went to the man in charge of the zoo, Mr. Rottswillow, who, after some coaxing, agreed to let the animals roam free on his golf course instead.
 The Royal Spy Academy is a school located in England where people learn how to be spies. This school was attended by Agent K, and is run by her mother, Agent B. Todd and Riley secretly enrolled in this school when Agent K's father took C.A.R. back to London with him in the episode "London Calling". They later took part in a high-speed chase to get the Spyclopedia back from Clive, C.A.R.'s evil replacement, when it was taken from the Royal Spy Academy.
 Fleemco is a company founded in 1989 by Colonel Cadmus K. Fleem, which is run today by Conrad Fleem. Fleemco is known for its many consumer products, such as FleemSol, Fleemer steamer, OxiFleem detergent, Fleem Brite toothpaste, Fleem Dream mattresses, FleemPod MP3 player, FleemDows computers, Fleem Star Line, which operates the steamship Fleemtanic, and Fleemsoft fabric softener. It is also known for its many online websites, including Fleemster, Fleemsody, FleemBay, and Fleembly But by far the most distinguishing characteristic of Fleemco is its ability to replace any given person at any given time, depending on the preference of its customers, of course. However, a customer must have a FleemTel cellphone in order to access this Fleemco service.
 George Stapler Middle School is the school that both Todd and Riley attend. It used to be called George Washington Middle School, however the name was changed in the episode "The Insecurity Guard" when Todd's Robo Fleem SGX intimidated his teacher into stating that George Stapler was in fact the first president of the United States' real name instead of George Washington.
 Le Petit Fromage is a French restaurant where Riley went with Johnny Hitswell on a date. Todd's parents later forced him to replace the American waiters there with real waiters from France in an attempt to make Riley's date absolutely perfect. However, this didn't turn out so well, as the French waiters never showed up, and Todd and his parents therefore had to disguise themselves as the waiters instead. The restaurant's name means "small cheese" in French.
 Carlos & Ed's Tacos is a fast food restaurant that is first seen in "The Rizzle" when Todd imagines himself as having glasses. In his imagination, the sun reflects off his glasses and melts different letters off this sign so that it reads "Closed". It is again seen in "A Buzzwork Orange" in the flashback where Jacobo and Buzz meet.
 Uncle Scorpion's Taco Shack is a restaurant in Spain. Agent K travels here as she believes that this is a cleverly disguised hideout of Dr. Scorpius.
 Pleasant Pop Popcorn is another restaurant in Pleasant Hills that Todd destroyed with the heat vision coming from his gigantic glasses (only in his imagination, of course).

Broadcast
The series ran originally from July 28, 2006, to March 30, 2009, on Disney Channel in the United States. Although the series originally aired episodes on Saturdays at 8:00pm EST, it was moved to Mondays at 5:00pm EST. The show was taken completely off the air on August 27, 2011, after being aired for the last time on ABC Kids prior to its cancellation.

The Replacements was shown on Disney Channel UK and Ireland, Family Channel in Canada, Disney Channel Spain, Disney Channel (Latin America), and Disney Channel Mexico.

Availability
The entire series of The Replacements is available on iTunes. Disney+ only has season 1 available; season 2 is absent from the service for unknown reasons.

References

External links

 
 

2000s American animated television series
2006 American television series debuts
2009 American television series endings
ABC Kids (TV programming block)
American children's animated comedy television series
Animated television series about orphans
Animated television series about siblings
Animated television series about children
Anime-influenced Western animated television series
Disney Channel original programming
English-language television shows
Television series by Disney Television Animation
Television series by Rough Draft Studios
Television shows set in Washington (state)